Naomie Guerra (born 1 June 1996) is a Trinidadian footballer who plays as a midfielder for the Trinidad and Tobago women's national team.

International goals
Scores and results list Trinidad and Tobago's goal tally first

References

External links 
 

1996 births
Living people
Women's association football midfielders
Women's association football defenders
Trinidad and Tobago women's footballers
People from Arima
Trinidad and Tobago women's international footballers
Competitors at the 2018 Central American and Caribbean Games
Wright State Raiders women's soccer players
Trinidad and Tobago expatriate women's footballers
Trinidad and Tobago expatriate sportspeople in the United States
Expatriate women's soccer players in the United States